The 1946 Grand Prix season was the first post-war year for Grand Prix motor racing. It was notable for including the first ever race run to Formula One criteria, the 1946 Turin Grand Prix.  There was no organised championship in 1946, although Raymond Sommer proved to be the most successful driver, winning five Grands Prix. Maserati's cars proved difficult to beat, winning 9 of the season's 20 Grand Prix races.

Season review

Grands Prix

Statistics

Grand Prix winners

Drivers

Manufacturers

References

Grand Prix seasons